José Miguel Ureña Rodriguez (born September 12, 1991) is a Dominican professional baseball pitcher for the Colorado Rockies of Major League Baseball (MLB). He has previously played MLB for the Miami Marlins, Detroit Tigers, and Milwaukee Brewers.

Career

Minor leagues

Ureña grew up in the Dominican Republic. The Marlins signed him on August 28, 2009, and he played for two seasons with the Dominican Summer League Marlins. In 2011, he played in short season Single-A with the Jamestown Jammers, posting a 4.33 ERA in 15 starts. In 2012, he advanced to full-season Single-A, posting a 3.38 ERA in 138.1 innings with the Greensboro Grasshoppers. In 2013, he played in high Single-A with the Jupiter Hammerheads, pitching 149.2 innings with a 3.73 ERA. In 2014, he amassed a record of 13-8, pitching 162 innings with 121 strikeouts and a 3.33 ERA.

Ureña began the 2015 season with the New Orleans Zephyrs of the Class AAA Pacific Coast League.

Miami Marlins
Ureña was called up to the majors for the first time on April 13, 2015 to replace David Phelps. In his first major league start on May 26, 2015, against the Pittsburgh Pirates, he gave up five runs in  innings and took the 5–1 loss. In 20 games (9 starts) with the Marlins in 2015, Ureña finished with a 1–5 record and a 5.25 ERA.

In 2016, Ureña split time starting and in the bullpen, finishing the year with a 4–9 record and a 6.13 ERA in 28 games (12 starts).

In 2017, Ureña improved, appearing in 34 games (28 starts) with a 14–7 record, and a 3.82 ERA. He also hit a league-leading 14 batsmen with pitches.

Ureña was named the Opening Day starter for 2018. On Opening Day against the Chicago Cubs on March 29, 2018, Ureña did not fare well as he surrendered a home run by Ian Happ on the first pitch he threw. He allowed five runs altogether in 4+ innings as the Marlins lost 8-4.  Ureña started 16 games for the Marlins before landing on the disabled list with a shoulder injury. On August 15, 2018, he was ejected from a game against the Atlanta Braves after hitting Ronald Acuña Jr. on the elbow with the first pitch of the game, which led to the Braves' and Marlins' benches clearing. Acuña had hit a home run in his previous five games. Ureña received a six-game suspension for his role in the altercation. In his next start, Ureña threw a complete game against the Washington Nationals, giving up one run on two hits while striking out four batters. He ended the season going 6–0 in his final seven starts to go along with a 1.80 ERA.

By posting a 3.82 ERA in 2017 and a 3.98 ERA in 2018, Ureña became just the sixth starting pitcher in Marlins history to post a sub-4.00 ERA in consecutive seasons, joining Pat Rapp, Kevin Brown, Dontrelle Willis, Josh Johnson, and Aníbal Sánchez.

In 2019, Ureña became the eighth pitcher in Marlins history to make consecutive Opening Day starts. After beginning the season 0–3, he tossed quality starts in eight of his next nine outings, going 4–3 with a 2.95 ERA over that span. Following a start against the Atlanta Braves on June 7, 2019, Ureña was placed on the injured list with a herniated disc in his lower back. At the time of his injury, he was tied for twelfth in the MLB with eight quality starts. On November 30, 2020, Ureña was designated for assignment following the acquisition of Adam Cimber. On December 2, Urena was non-tendered by the Marlins.

Detroit Tigers
On December 23, 2020, Ureña signed a one year, $3.25 million contract with the Detroit Tigers. Ureña earned a spot in the Tigers starting rotation to begin the 2021 season. After three losses to start the season, Ureña earned his first victory as a Tiger on April 27, allowing one earned run in seven innings as the Tigers beat the Chicago White Sox, 5–2. On May 2, 2021, Ureña became the first Tiger pitcher since David Price in 2015 to have four consecutive starts of at least seven innings while allowing two runs or fewer in every start. However, due to poor run support, Ureña only won one of these games. Ureña was placed on the 10-day injured list with a groin strain on June 17. He returned to make a start on August 28. He pitched in 26 games (18 starts) for the 2021 Tigers, compiling a 4–8 record with a 5.81 ERA.

Milwaukee Brewers
On March 29, 2022, Ureña signed a minor league contract with the Milwaukee Brewers. The following day, Ureña had his contract selected to the 40-man and active rosters. He pitched to a 3.52 ERA with 3 strikeouts in 4 relief appearances for Milwaukee before he was designated for assignment on May 2. He elected free agency on May 10, 2022.

Colorado Rockies
On May 13, 2022, Ureña signed a minor league deal with the Colorado Rockies organization. On July 6, 2022, he was called up to the majors.

On November 11, 2022, Ureña signed a one-year, $3 million contract with a 2024 club option.

Pitching style
According to a scouting report prepared for MLB's 2014 midseason prospect rankings, the eighth-ranked Ureña had "an above-average fastball that can touch the mid 90s", a change-up, and a breaking ball that is "a combination of a slider and a curve". He was said to have "above-average command". However, Ureña's command of the ball has dipped significantly since the start of the 2017 season with ESPN writers recognizing "a history of control problems," noting that in 2017, he hit 14 batters in 2017, tying in the MLB for hit batters, and as of hitting Ronald Acuña Jr. in 2018, had tied for second in the National League, hitting 10 batters.

According to Fangraphs, Ureña throws four-seam and sinking two-seam fastballs that each average 95 MPH (topping out at 99 MPH). His "slurve" is thrown at 84 to 88 MPH, and he mixes in a changeup at about 89 MPH.

References

External links

1991 births
Living people
Colorado Rockies players
Detroit Tigers players
Dominican Republic expatriate baseball players in the United States
Dominican Summer League Marlins players
Greensboro Grasshoppers players
Jacksonville Suns players
Jamestown Jammers players
Jupiter Hammerheads players
Major League Baseball players from the Dominican Republic
Miami Marlins players
Milwaukee Brewers players
New Orleans Zephyrs players
Sportspeople from Santo Domingo